Sadahiko (written:  or ) is a masculine Japanese given name. Notable people with the name include:

, Japanese businessman
, Imperial Japanese Army general

Japanese masculine given names